The 2008 National Lacrosse League season, the 22nd in the history of the NLL, began on December 29, 2007, and concluded with the Buffalo Bandits winning the championship game over the Portland LumberJax on May 17, 2008.

In an odd coincidence, all four eastern division teams that made the playoffs finished with identical 10–6 records. Due to tiebreakers, the Buffalo Bandits clinched first place overall, followed by the Minnesota Swarm, New York Titans in their playoff debut, and the Philadelphia Wings in their return to the playoffs after a five-year absence.

There was also a tie atop the west division standings, as the San Jose Stealth and Colorado Mammoth both finished with 9–7 records. The Stealth won that tiebreaker and clinched their first western division title. The Calgary Roughnecks and Portland LumberJax finished out the playoff teams in the west despite having losing records.

History was made in 2008 as neither the Rochester Knighthawks nor the Toronto Rock made the playoffs, for the first time in the history of either team (though the Toronto franchise, then the Ontario Raiders, missed the playoffs in their inaugural season in 1998). The Knighthawks broke a 13-year streak of making the playoffs, the Rock streak was stopped at 9 years.

Philadelphia Wings second-year stars Athan Iannucci and Geoff Snider set a number of new league records in 2008. Iannucci eclipsed Gary Gait's record of 61 goals by scoring 71, and Snider set or tied marks in loose balls (244), face offs won (318, tied with Peter Jacobs in 2005), and penalty minutes (103).

The 2008 season almost never happened. On October 16, 2007, the league released a statement officially cancelling the season, after no agreement could be reached on a new collective bargaining agreement. However, negotiations continued, and on October 25, the league announced that a new CBA has been agreed on, and that the season would proceed. The new revised schedule was released on November 2, 2007, but only included 12 of the expected 14 teams. The expansion Boston Blazers and 2007 Western division champion Arizona Sting had decided for "a number of business reasons" to opt out of the 2008 season and return in 2009.  Due to the short time frame between the agreement on a new CBA and the start of the season, the New York Titans were unable to secure 8 home dates for the revised schedule, and thus both the Toronto Rock and Buffalo Bandits hosted a Titans home game in their own arena.

Team movement
An expansion franchise for Boston, Massachusetts was announced on May 9, 2007.  It was expected that the team would play at the TD Banknorth Garden, which is also home to the NBA's Boston Celtics and the NHL's Boston Bruins.  On October 3, 2007, the Boston franchise was officially named the Boston Blazers.

When the revised schedule was released on November 2, 2007, it was announced that both the Arizona Sting and Boston Blazers were suspending operations for the 2008 season, returning in 2009.

Work stoppage
In the off-season between the 2007 and 2008 seasons the Collective Bargaining Agreement between the National Lacrosse League and the Professional Lacrosse Players' Association expired.  The owners announced that if there no deal was in place before midnight, October 15, 2007 the 2008 season would be cancelled. On the morning of October 16, the league announced that no agreement had been reached, and that the season was cancelled. The next day, commissioner Jim Jennings even said that the league would not change its mind about the cancellation, saying: 

However, the negotiations continued, and on October 25, the league announced that a new seven-year agreement had been reached, and that the season would be played.

Before the initial cancellation of the season, the Versus network announced that it would not carry a game of the week, as they had in 2007, even if an agreement was reached before the deadline.

Final standings

Playoffs

Milestones and events

Pre-season
 August 22, 2007: Colorado Mammoth head coach Gary Gait announced that he was stepping down to become the head coach of the women's lacrosse team at his alma mater, Syracuse University. Former Arizona Sting assistant coach Bob McMahon was announced as Gait's replacement.
 July 24, 2007: Less than three months after the end of the 2007 NLL season, the league announced one of the biggest blockbuster trades in NLL history. The trade involved three teams and six players, including a former Rookie of the Year and a former MVP and Goaltender of the Year. The trade saw the Calgary Roughnecks sending defenseman Taylor Wray to the Philadelphia Wings, and their first-round pick in the 2007 entry draft and their second-round pick in the 2008 entry draft to the Buffalo Bandits. The Wings sent Sean Greenhalgh to Buffalo and Ian Llord to Calgary, and the Bandits sent goaltender Steve Dietrich and Kyle Couling to Calgary and Jason Crosbie to Philadelphia.  During the entry draft in September, Llord was traded again, this time from Calgary to Buffalo for two draft picks.
 October 16, 2007: The league announced that the 2008 season had been cancelled due to the failure of the owners and players to reach a CBA.
 October 25, 2007: The league announced that a new agreement had been reached, and that the 2008 would indeed be played.
 November 2, 2007: The revised schedule was released, and the league announced that the Arizona Sting and Boston Blazers would not play in 2008.
  November 5, 2007: A dispersal draft was held for the remaining teams to choose players from the Arizona and Boston franchises.

Regular season
 January 9: The league announced the inductees into the National Lacrosse League Hall of Fame for 2008: Sal LoCascio, Johnny Mouradian, Tony Resch, and Neil Stevens.
 January 12: The Rochester Knighthawks' 16-game winning streak came to an end as the Buffalo Bandits defeated the Knighthawks 14–9 in Rochester. The Knighthawks had extended the streak with a victory over Buffalo in the opening game the previous night.
 January 17: The NLL announced that New York Titans star Casey Powell would once again host "Inside the NLL with Casey Powell", a weekly one-hour show on Sirius Satellite Radio.
 January 20: John Tavares of the Buffalo Bandits scored his 597th career goal in a win over the New York Titans, passing Gary Gait and becoming the NLL's all-time leader in goals scored.
 January 30: The Edmonton Rush traded Chris Seller to the Calgary Roughnecks for a third-round draft pick in the 2008 entry draft.
 February 5: Forward Andrew Lazore is traded from the Chicago Shamrox to the Buffalo Bandits for two second-round draft picks in the 2008 entry draft.
 February 8: The Minnesota Swarm established a league record by running up a 12–0 lead before the New York Titans broke their scoreless streak in the third quarter.
 February 20: After starting the season with an 0–5 record, the Rush fired the franchise's original head coach and general manager, Paul Day.  On February 21, the Rush announced that Day's replacement would be former NLL Coach and GM of the Year Bob Hamley.
 March 5: Three separate trades involving four teams and six players were made:
 Edmonton traded a 2008 conditional third-round draft pick and a 2009 conditional third-round draft pick to Chicago for Lindsay Plunkett
 Chicago sent goalie Brandon Miller and a 2008 second-round draft pick to Philadelphia for Matt Roik, Brad Self, a 2009 first-round draft pick, and a 2010 second-round draft pick
 In a three-way deal, Edmonton sent A.J. Shannon to Philadelphia, the Wings send Dan Marohl and Keith Cromwell to Minnesota, and Minnesota sent Mike Hominuck to the Rush.
 March 22: Colorado's Brian Langtry scored 9 goals and assisted on 4 others in a losing cause, as the Mammoth lost to the Portland LumberJax. Langtry's 9 goals is the most scored by a player in one game this season.
 March 25: Multiple players were dealt on the season's trade deadline:
In an exchange of All-Stars, the Toronto Rock traded set-up man Josh Sanderson to the Calgary Roughnecks for finisher Lewis Ratcliff.  The teams also exchanged draft picks.
 The Edmonton Rush were the most active at the deadline, exchanging goalkeepers with the Portland LumberJax with Matt Disher and a fourth-round draft pick going to the LumberJax in exchange for Matt King, Ian Crashley, and a first-round pick in the 2009 draft.  The Rush traded Chris Gill and a second-round pick to the Colorado Mammoth for a first-round draft pick in the 2008 draft, and also traded Mike Accursi to the Buffalo Bandits for Dan Teat, a second-round draft pick in the 2008 draft, a first-round draft pick in the 2009 draft.
 April 12: Athan Iannucci scored three goals and broke Gary Gait's record of 61 goals in a season. Iannucci entered the game with 60 goals, averaging 4.6 goals per game, but didn't score the record-tying goal until six minutes into the third quarter. He then scored the record-setting goal less than three minutes later and then completed his hat-trick in the fourth quarter.
 April 27: After announcing his retirement earlier in the year, Jim Veltman, the league's all-time loose balls leader, played the final game of his 16-year career.

Glenn Clark suspension
On January 11, the Minnesota Swarm defeated the Toronto Rock 17–16 in overtime, in a game which saw three Swarm players and one Rock player given game misconducts. After the game, Rock head coach Glenn Clark was involved in an altercation with Minnesota forward Sean Pollock outside the Rock dressing room. Clark was later charged with assault by Toronto Police and suspended indefinitely by the NLL. The Rock announced that assistant coach Terry Bullen would serve as the interim head coach and Bullen led the Rock to a 2–2 record.

On February 6, the charges against Clark were dropped by Toronto Police, and the NLL lifted the suspension on February 13.

All-Star game
The 2008 All-Star Game was held at Rexall Place in Edmonton on March 16, 2008. The East division All-Stars defeated the West division 17–16 in overtime, as Shawn Williams scored the winner 31 seconds into OT. Philadelphia Wings' transition player Geoff Snider was named MVP.

All-Star teams

* Unable to play due to injury

Awards

Annual

All-Pro teams
First Team
 Athan Iannucci, Philadelphia
 Casey Powell, New York
 John Tavares, Buffalo
 Mark Steenhuis, Buffalo
 Ryan Cousins, Minnesota
 Bob Watson, Toronto

Second Team
 Colin Doyle, San Jose
 Gavin Prout, Colorado
 Jeff Zywicki, San Jose
 Geoff Snider, Philadelphia
 Scott Self, Chicago
 Matt Vinc, New York

All-Rookie team
 Craig Point, Minnesota
 Tyler Codron, Portland
 Jordan Hall, New York
 Bobby McBride, Chicago
 Jamie Rooney, Philadelphia
 Merrick Thomson, Philadelphia

Weekly awards
The NLL gives out awards weekly for the best overall player, best offensive player, best transition player, best defensive player, and best rookie.

Monthly awards
Awards are also given out monthly for the best overall player and best rookie.

Statistics leaders
Bold numbers indicate new single-season records. Italics indicate tied single-season records.

See also
 2008 in sports

References

External links
 Original 2008 NLL schedule
 Revised 2008 NLL schedule

08
National Lacrosse League